Space Primates are a DJ/songwriting/production duo from England. They have made records with artists such as Katy Perry, David Guetta, DJ Snake, Chris Brown, Maluma, Flo Rida, Ozuna, Ciara, DVBBS, Gashi, Enrique Iglesias, Upsahl and many more. Their music has been featured in shows and films such as Baywatch, The Secret Life of Pets 2, Kevin Hart's What Now, The Mindy Project and on the NFL. In 2019 they were nominated for a Daytime Emmy for their work on the Green Eggs and Ham main title.

History 
Space Primates met in 2010. Throughout college they both played Guitar in wedding bands, and for a range of acts such as Krept and Konan, Sneakbo, and Rama Katani. They both took an interest in music production during their time at college and began collaborating. Shortly after leaving college they entered a remix competition on Indaba Music for Capital Cities which they won. They then decided to travel to Los Angeles in the hopes of finding bigger artists and publishers to work with. In 2015 they signed a publishing deal with Dr. Luke's company Prescription Songs. Shortly after they had their first major release with "Whip It!" by LunchMoney Lewis which charted globally. Following on from this they wrote and produced The X Factor runner ups Reggie 'n' Bollie's debut single "New Girl (song)" before moving to LA in late 2016.

Artist career 
2018 saw Space Primates release their debut record as artists, "My Life" which has seen over three million streams across all platforms. The follow up "Fade Out" with Norwegian artists Seeb and Olivia O'Brien has amassed over 40 million streams. In 2021 they collaborated with Dvbbs and Gashi for the single "Say It".

Discography

Production and Songwriting Credits

References 

English electronic music duos
Male musical duos
DJs from London
English record producers
DJ duos